Hit Him Again is a 1918 American short comedy film featuring Harold Lloyd. This is now considered to be a lost film.

Cast
 Harold Lloyd as The Boy
 Snub Pollard 
 Bebe Daniels 
 William Blaisdell
 Sammy Brooks
 Lige Conley (as Lige Cromley)
 Billy Fay
 Lew Harvey
 Gus Leonard
 James Parrott
 King Zany (as Charles Dill)

See also
 Harold Lloyd filmography
 List of lost films

References

External links

1918 films
1918 comedy films
1918 short films
American silent short films
American black-and-white films
Films directed by Gilbert Pratt
Lost American films
Silent American comedy films
Films with screenplays by H. M. Walker
American comedy short films
1918 lost films
Lost comedy films
1910s American films